A by-election was held in the provincial district of Athabasca in Saskatchewan on February 15, 2022, following the resignation of incumbent New Democrat MLA Buckley Belanger.  After 16 years in Parliament, Belanger resigned from the legislature on August 15, 2021, to run in the 2021 Canadian federal election, as a federal Liberal in the riding of Desnethé—Missinippi—Churchill River. He was defeated.

The seat was vacant for six months between Belanger's resignation and the by-election. The seat, which was first contested in 1908, had been held by either the Liberals or New Democrats for the entirety of its history. Along with the neighbouring northern riding of Cumberland, the riding has been considered one of the safest New Democratic seats in Saskatchewan, although candidates for the centre-right Saskatchewan Party have polled somewhat better results in the 21st century compared to Saskatchewan Party and Progressive Conservative candidates in previous elections.

In a major upset, the Saskatchewan Party's Jim Lemaigre, defeated NDP candidate, and former federal MP for much of the district, Georgina Jolibois. The NDP had held the predominantly-indigenous riding almost continuously since 1975, and a conservative candidate had not come within ten percentage points of victory since 1964. The result also came in spite of polling in the month before showing the NDP closer to the Saskatchewan Party in province-wide support than any point in the previous five years.

Three days after the election, leader of the Saskatchewan New Democratic Party Ryan Meili announced his intention to resign as leader and trigger a leadership election.

Reaction 
In the immediate aftermath of the results, Saskatchewan Premier and Saskatchewan Party leader Scott Moe called the results "very significant", noting that the Saskatchewan Party government had "always had MLAs representing every part of the province, except for the far north. That changed tonight. Saskatchewan Party MLAs now represent every part of [Saskatchewan]."

Winning candidate Jim Lemaigre stated that he believed a desire for a voice in government had been key to the results, stating that "one elder put it quite nicely, he said 'We've been on the outside of government for so long, why wouldn't we put ourselves back there with this opportunity.' ".

The results also had a significant impact on the provincial NDP, with provincial leader Ryan Meili announcing his resignation as NDP leader three days after the election. Meili said the result was not the reason for his decision, but said that it was "clarifying", and conceded that losing the seat was "really disappointing." 

Ken Coates, a Professor of Public Policy at the University of Saskatchewan, expressed surprise at the results, arguing that the Saskatchewan Party “has not been very supportive of northern issues for quite some time” and hasn't consistently reached out to Indigenous people. He argued that the results demonstrated "the really serious failure of the NDP to understand the province of Saskatchewan outside Regina and Saskatoon." Coates argued that the results were primarily driven by local issues, stating that he did not think "either of the leaders played a critical role in this at all" but that the NDP  "really does not have a terribly good handle on Indigenous or rural issues".

Results

2020 result

References 

2022 elections in Canada
Provincial by-elections in Saskatchewan